is a Nippon Professional Baseball pitcher for the Tohoku Rakuten Golden Eagles in Japan's Pacific League.

External links

1978 births
Chunichi Dragons players
Japanese baseball coaches
Japanese baseball players
Living people
Nippon Professional Baseball coaches
Nippon Professional Baseball pitchers
People from Ise, Mie
Tohoku Rakuten Golden Eagles players